The Ibis GS-730 Super Magic is a Colombian STOL homebuilt aircraft that was designed and produced by Ibis Aircraft of Cali, introduced in 2007. When it was available the aircraft was supplied as a complete ready-to-fly-aircraft or as a kit for amateur construction.

Production has been completed and as of 2011 the aircraft was no longer part of the company's product line.

Design and development
The GS-730 Super Magic is a development of the lighter Ibis GS-700 Magic and features a cantilever high-wing with a Robertson STOL kit, a two-seats-in-side-by-side configuration enclosed cabin with doors, fixed tricycle landing gear with wheel pants and a single engine in tractor configuration.

The GS-730 Super Magic is made from sheet aluminium "all-metal" construction, with the wing tips and cowling made from composite material. The main landing gear is strengthened and made from 7075-T6 aluminium, while the nose gear has lever suspension using rubber pucks and helical springs. The main wheels include hydraulic disc brakes.

Specifications (GS-730 Super Magic)

References

External links

GS-730
2000s Colombian civil utility aircraft
2000s Colombian ultralight aircraft
Single-engined tractor aircraft
High-wing aircraft
Homebuilt aircraft